Akhdiyat Duta Modjo (popularly known as   Duta; born in Lexington, Kentucky on April 30, 1980) is the vocalist of Indonesian band, Sheila on 7.

Early life
Duta is the eldest of two brothers. His father, Hakam S. Modjo, was a native of Limboto, Gorontalo and a professor of plant pathology at the Gadjah Mada University in Yogyakarta. From his father's lineage, Duta is a descendant of Kyai Mojo, a well-known Javanese Muslim cleric who fought alongside Diponegoro during the Java War and was exiled to the northern mountains of Sulawesi.

Duta was born in Lexington while his father pursued his graduate studies at the University of Kentucky. His family later settled in Yogya, where Duta grew up and briefly studied agricultural technology at Gadjah Mada; he dropped out to pursue his musical career with Sheila on 7.

Duta is married to Adelia Lontoh, a former model; the couple had two children.

Filmography
 30 Hari Mencari Cinta (2004)
 Tak Biasa (2004)
 Ambilkan Bulan (2012)

References

Living people
1980 births
Musicians from Kentucky
Gadjah Mada University alumni